Stikeman Elliott LLP is a Canadian business law firm founded in 1952 by H. Heward Stikeman and Fraser Elliott. The firm has offices located in Montreal, Toronto, Ottawa, Calgary, Vancouver, New York, London and Sydney. Since 2021, the firm's chairman is Jeffrey Singer.

History
Heward Stikeman and Fraser Elliott established a tax boutique firm in Montreal in 1952. The firm expanded throughout the ensuing years, eventually becoming a full-service business law firm. Stikeman Elliott has never merged with another firm, one of the few Bay Street firms to not do so. When it expanded to Toronto in 1970, two new partners were added, Donald Bowman and John Robarts, and the Toronto office became Stikeman, Elliott, Robarts and Bowman.

One of the first national firms to maintain an office in Quebec, along with McCarthy Tétrault, Stikeman Elliott is widely considered one of the best firms in Quebec. The firm is one of the Seven Sisters, a group of seven prominent Canadian law firms.

The firm added eight new partners in January 2022.

Notable lawyers and alumni
 Suzanne Côté, puisne justice of the Supreme Court of Canada
Erin O'Toole, former Leader of the Opposition and former federal cabinet minister
Calin Rovinescu, former CEO of Air Canada
Alon Eizenman, ice hockey player
 Allan Gotlieb, Canadian ambassador to the United States from 1981 to 1989
 Donald Johnston, former federal cabinet minister and Secretary-General of the Organisation for Economic Co-operation and Development (OECD) from 1996 to 2006
 Antonio Lamer, former Chief Justice of Canada; Senior Counsel (2000-2007)
 Catherine McKenna, Minister of Environmental and Climate Change
 Marc Miller, Minister of Indigenous Services Canada
 Dick Pound, former VP of the IOC and former President of the World Anti-Doping Agency
 John Robarts, former premier of Ontario
 John Sopinka, former puisne justice on the Supreme Court of Canada
 John Turner, 17th Prime Minister of Canada

References

Foreign law firms with offices in the United States
Law firms established in 1952
Law firms of Canada
1952 establishments in Canada